Emamzadeh Zakaria (also Romanized as Emāmzādeh Zakarīā; also known as Emāmzādeh Ḩaẕrat-e Zakarīā) is a village in Soghan Rural District, Soghan District, Arzuiyeh County, Kerman Province, Iran. At the 2006 census, its population was 35, in 11 families.

References 

Populated places in Arzuiyeh County